The Avon Gorge is a small wooded gorge in Falkirk, Scotland.

Biology 
The steep wooded banks constitute one of the few remaining ancient, semi-natural woodland sites in Falkirk District.

Plants found here which are rare in Falkirk District include alternate-leaved golden saxifrage (chrysosplenium alternifolium), moschatel (adoxa moschatellina) and hemp agrimony (eupatorium cannabinum). The site also contains pendulous sedge (carex pendula) and lily of the valley (convallaria majalis) both of which are uncommon in Scotland.

The Avon Gorge is one of the few remaining oak-dominated woodlands in the central belt of Scotland, others include the nearby Callendar wood.

History 
After defeat at the Battle of Falkirk, William Wallace reportedly took refuge in a cave in the Avon Gorge. The cave is signposted from a nearby road as 'Wallace's Cave'.

Transport 
The A801 road cuts through the Avon Gorge and has a small crossing point accompanied by steep dips. This has been recognised as an accident blackspot particularly in bad weather conditions. There have been numerous calls from local politicians for upgrades to take place and for a new bridge crossing to be built over the gorge. However there have been no firm commitments from local authorities or national government for such a scheme.

See also
Avon Aqueduct
River Avon

References

Landforms of Falkirk (council area)
Canyons and gorges of Scotland
Sites of Special Scientific Interest in Falkirk and Clackmannan
Sites of Special Scientific Interest notified in 1986